Edward Joseph "Eddy" Beers (born October 12, 1959) is a Dutch-born Canadian former professional ice hockey winger who played 250 games in the National Hockey League (NHL) with the Calgary Flames and St. Louis Blues between 1982 and 1986. He was nearly a point per game player in his time in the NHL, but his NHL career was cut short by injury.

Playing career
Born in Zwaag, Netherlands, Beers played for the Calgary Flames and St. Louis Blues. He also played for the University of Denver in the NCAA from 1979 to 1982 and led the NCAA in scoring his senior season. In 1982, Beers became the second player born in the Netherlands to play in the NHL.

Career statistics

Regular season and playoffs

Awards and honours

References

External links 
 

1959 births
Living people
Calgary Flames players
Canadian ice hockey left wingers
Colorado Flames players
Denver Pioneers men's ice hockey players
Dutch emigrants to Canada
Dutch ice hockey left wingers
Ice hockey people from British Columbia
Merritt Centennials players
People from Zwaag
St. Louis Blues players
Sportspeople from North Holland
Undrafted National Hockey League players